"Feelin' It" is a song written by Frank Rogers and Matthew West, and recorded by American  country music artist Scotty McCreery.  The song is his fifth official single, and the second from his second studio album See You Tonight (2013).

Content
The song is themed after summertime recreations.

Critical reception
In a track-by-track review of See You Tonight for Billboard, Chuck Dauphin wrote that "the song has a definite contemporary sheen. It's probably not going to win any Song of the Year prizes, but it's just 3:19 of fun. Sometimes, that's as it should be!"

Music video
The music video was directed by Roman White and shot at the Outer Banks and Bodie Island, North Carolina.

The video shows McCreery and his friends at the beach and playing in the water.

Chart performance
The song entered the Billboard Hot 100 at No. 96 on October 1, 2014. on has sold 293,000 copies in the US as of January 2015.

Year-end charts

Certifications

References

2013 songs
2014 singles
Mercury Nashville singles
Scotty McCreery songs
Songs written by Frank Rogers (record producer)
Songs written by Matthew West
Song recordings produced by Frank Rogers (record producer)
Music videos directed by Roman White